Sun Shuyun (born in 1963) is a Chinese writer.  Sun was born in China and graduated from Beijing University and won a scholarship to the University of Oxford. Her books include Ten Thousand Miles Without a Cloud (in which she retraces the journey of the 7th-century Chinese monk Xuanzang), The Long March: The True History of Communist China's Founding Myth, A Year in Tibet, a book made in conjunction with the BBC documentary A Year in Tibet.

References 
Book review of A Year In Tibet
Tibet: Transformation and tradition about the BBC series A Year In Tibet.
Another review of the BBC series

External links

1963 births
Living people
Chinese documentary film directors
Chinese travel writers
People's Republic of China historians
Peking University alumni
Chinese film producers
Alumni of the University of Oxford